The White Circle is a lost 1920 American silent drama film directed by Maurice Tourneur and written by John Gilbert and Jules Furthman. The film stars Spottiswoode Aitken, Janice Wilson, Harry Northrup, John Gilbert, Wesley Barry, and Jack McDonald. It is based on the short story "The Pavilion on the Links" by Robert Louis Stevenson. The film was released on August 22, 1920, by Paramount Pictures.

Plot
As described in a film magazine, Frank Cassilis (Gilbert), a wanderer, returns once each year to a spot on the bleak Scottish coast to fulfill his word of honor to his archenemy Northmour (Northrup), a wealthy soldier of fortune in whose hands hang his life. During the visit in 1860 during the night Northmour lands from his yacht in company with Bernard Huddlestone (Aitken), a London banker fleeing from the danger of the Society of Carbonari, formed of Italians in London. The white circle is the warning mark used by this society. Huddlestone has misused funds entrusted to him by the society and lost them in speculation, so he has bargained away his daughter Clara (Wilson) to Northmour for his protection. Accompanying them on this night, she finds love when she sees Cassilis. Later, following the death of Huddlestone and the burning of Northmour's great home on the Scottish shore by the Italians, the worth of Northmour's reputed character is revealed when he leaves the young woman with Cassilis and spares the latter's life.

Cast
Spottiswoode Aitken as Bernard Huddlestone
Janice Wilson as Clara Huddlestone
Harry Northrup as Northmour (credited as Harry S. Northrup)
John Gilbert as Frank Cassilis (credited as Jack Gilbert)
Wesley Barry as Ferd
Jack McDonald as Gregorio

References

External links

1920 films
1920s English-language films
Silent American drama films
1920 drama films
Paramount Pictures films
Films based on works by Robert Louis Stevenson
Films directed by Maurice Tourneur
American black-and-white films
American silent feature films
Lost American films
Films based on short fiction
1920 lost films
Lost drama films
1920s American films